Agaraea schausi is a moth of the family Erebidae. It was described by Walter Rothschild in 1909. It is found in Mexico and Panama.

References

Moths described in 1909
Phaegopterina
Moths of North America